A lioness is a female lion.

Lioness(es) may also refer to:

Music
 Lioness Records, a British record label
 Lioness (band), a Canadian indie rock band
 Lioness (EP), their 2008 EP
 Lioness (Sivert Høyem album), 2016
 Lioness (Beccy Cole album), 2018
 The Lioness (album), a 2000 album by Songs: Ohia, or its title song
 Lioness: Hidden Treasures, a 2011 posthumous compilation album by Amy Winehouse

Other media
Lioness (film), a documentary about the American servicewomen in Iraq
Lioness (South African TV series), a crime drama (2021 onwards)
Lioness (American TV series), an upcoming spy thriller
The Lioness (novel), a Dragonlance novel by Nancy Varian Berberick

Sports teams

United Kingdom
England women's national football team
England women's national rugby league team
Great Britain women's national rugby league team
Millwall Lionesses L.F.C., an English women's football club
London City Lionesses, an English women's football club

Elsewhere
Argentina women's national field hockey team
Kenya women's national rugby sevens team

Other uses
Team Lioness, female teams of United States Marines during the Iraq War
USS Lioness (1857), a steam ram

See also
 Lion (disambiguation)
 Lioness Asuka, Japanese professional wrestler